The Uzbeks (Uzbek: Oʻzbek, Ўзбек, اۉزبېک, plural: Oʻzbeklar, Ўзбеклар, اۉزبېکلر) were one of the first Karluk Turks to arrive in the modern-day region of Pakistan, they ruled the area of Pakhli (modern-day Hazara) for over 200 years from 1472 to 1703. Uzbeks form a significant minority group in Khyber-Pakhtunkhwa province and FATA (Federally administrated Tribal areas) of Pakistan.

There are many Uzbek immigrants in Pakistan from Central Asian countries, mainly Afghanistan and Uzbekistan. Around 2.3% of the Afghans residing in Pakistan are ethnic Uzbeks. The Afghan War drove them to Pakistan. In 1981, many Afghan Uzbek refugees in Pakistan moved to Turkey to join the existing communities based in Kayseri, Izmir, Ankara and Zeytinburnu. The Uzbeks can be found mainly in north-west Pakistan, comprising the areas of Khyber Pakhtunkhwa (in particular Peshawar), Gilgit-Baltistan and Balochistan. Additionally, Uzbek militants allied to al-Qaeda from the Islamic Movement of Uzbekistan and Islamic Jihad Union are believed to reside in the Federally Administered Tribal Areas. Their number at their height was predicted to be anywhere from 500 to 5,000. Now, only a few hundred foreign militants of various nationalities are thought to remain in Pakistan – the majority either having been killed by the Pakistani military's Zarb-e-Azb operation launched in 2014 or shifting to other theaters of jihadist conflicts, such as Syria.

History

Timurid Empire

The empire was founded by Timur (also known as Tamerlane) who was born in modern day Uzbekistan, a warlord of Turco-Mongol lineage, who established the empire between 1370 and his death in 1405. The Timurid empire included many parts of modern day Pakistan, such as Punjab, Balochistan, Khyber Pakthunkhwa, Gilgit-Baltistan and Kashmir and left a lasting impact to this region culturally and ethnically. He envisioned himself as the great restorer of the Mongol Empire of Genghis Khan, regarded himself as Genghis's heir, and associated closely with the Borjigin. Timur continued vigorous trade relations with Ming China and the Golden Horde, with Chinese diplomats like Ma Huan and Chen Cheng regularly traveling west to Samarkand to buy and sell goods. The empire led to the Timurid Renaissance, particularly during the reign of astronomer and mathematician Ulugh Begh.

By 1467, the ruling Timurid dynasty, or Timurids, had lost most of Persia to the Aq Qoyunlu confederation. However, members of the Timurid dynasty continued to rule smaller states, sometimes known as Timurid emirates, in Central Asia and parts of India. In the 16th century, Babur, a Timurid prince from Ferghana (modern Uzbekistan), invaded Kabulistan (modern Afghanistan) and established a small kingdom there. Twenty years later, he used this kingdom as a staging ground to invade the Delhi Sultanate in India and establish the Mughal Empire.

Mughal Empire

The Mughal empire is conventionally said to have been founded in 1526 by Babur, a warrior chieftain from what is today Uzbekistan, who employed aid from the neighboring Safavid and Ottoman empires, to defeat the Sultan of Delhi, Ibrahim Lodi, in the First Battle of Panipat, much of what is modern day Pakistan was under the Mughal empire, until its collapse. The Mughal imperial structure, however, is sometimes dated to 1600, to the rule of Babur's grandson, Akbar. This imperial structure lasted until 1720, shortly after the death of the last major emperor, Aurangzeb, during whose reign the empire also achieved its maximum geographical extent. Reduced subsequently to the region in and around Old Delhi by 1760, the empire was formally dissolved by the British Raj after the Indian Rebellion of 1857.

The Mughal designation for their own dynasty was Gurkani. The use of "Mughal" and "Moghul" derived from the Arabic and Persian corruption of "Mongol", and it emphasised the Mongol origins of the Timurid dynasty. The term gained currency during the 19th century, but remains disputed by Indologists. Similar transliterations had been used to refer to the empire, including "Mogul" and "Moghul". Nevertheless, Babur's ancestors were sharply distinguished from the classical Mongols insofar as they were oriented towards Persian rather than Turco-Mongol culture. The Mughals themselves claimed ultimate descent from Mongol Empire founder Genghis Khan.

See also
 2014 Karachi airport attack
 Mohammad Rozi

References

Sources

Further reading

 Who are the Uzbeks launching terror strikes in Pakistan?

External links

 
Ethnic groups in Pakistan
 
Pakistan–Uzbekistan relations
Afghan diaspora in Pakistan